Eupithecia amurensis is a moth in the  family Geometridae. It is found in Russia (Amur).

References

Moths described in 1954
amurensis
Moths of Asia